Shawn Dou (born 15 December 1988) is a Chinese Canadian actor.

Life and education
Dou was born in Xi'an. His parents migrated to Canada when Dou was ten years old. Dou attended David Lloyd George Elementary School in Vancouver. There, Dou learned Karate and won the championship for two years consecutively. After graduating from DLG in 2001, he attended Sir Winston Churchill Secondary School in Vancouver, BC, and graduated from there in 2006. He returned to China and was accepted by the Beijing Film Academy in 2008. When Dou was in his second year of studies, he participated in the auditions for The Love of the Hawthorn Tree and was subsequently picked as the male lead.

Career
Dou rose to fame for his role in Zhang Yimou's film, The Love of the Hawthorn Tree (2010). He then starred in the romance drama film, The Seal of Love (2011), directed by Huo Jianqi. 
Dou starred in films of various genres, most notably, Wolf Totem (2015) and Youth Dinner (2017), which won him the Best Actor award at the 11th Festival Du Cinema Chinois De Paris.

Dou gained mainstream recognition for his role as an antagonistic prince in the highly popular historical drama, Princess Agents. Thereafter, he starred in the fantasy epic drama, Tribes and Empires: Storm of Prophecy.

In 2019, Dou starred in the romance dramas See You Again, alongside Tiffany Tang; as well as Ten Years Late.  The same year, he co-starred in the action thriller Breakout: Sky Fire.

In 2020, Dou reunited with Tiffany Tang in the historical drama, The Legend of Xiao Chuo, portraying Han Derang.

Filmography

Film

Television series

Awards and nominations

References

External links
Shawn Dou on Internet Movie Database

1988 births
Chinese emigrants to Canada
Living people
Male actors from Vancouver
Male actors from Xi'an
Naturalized citizens of Canada
Chinese male film actors
Chinese male television actors
21st-century Chinese male actors
Beijing Film Academy alumni